Sir Alexander Livingston of Callendar (died 1451) was a significant figure in the early part of the reign of King James II of Scotland.

Life
Alexander Livingston was the son of Sir John Livingston of Callendar and his wife Marjorie, a daughter of Sir John Menteith of Kerse.

He was Justiciar of Scotland, and keeper of Stirling Castle for at least part of the king's minority, during which he had custody of the king.  He conspired with William Crichton, the Lord Chancellor, in the assassination of the 6th Earl of Douglas and his brother, David, at the "Black Dinner" at Edinburgh Castle.  Later he allied with the Douglases against Crichton.

Marriage and issue
Livingston married a daughter of James or John Dundas of that ilk, and had issue:
James Livingston, 1st Lord Livingston (d.1467)
Alexander Livingston of Phildes (d. 22 January 1450)
Janet Livingston, married James Hamilton of Cadzow
Elizabeth Livingston

In fiction 
His role in the events of the time is dealt with in Black Douglas by Nigel Tranter. He also has a role in Black Douglas by Samuel Rutherford Crockett.

References

Notes

Sources

Balfour Paul, Sir James, Scots Peerage IX vols., Edinburgh 1904.
The Lion in the North John Prebble

15th-century Scottish people
People from Stirling (council area)
1451 deaths